Lithuania competed at the 2019 World Aquatics Championships in Gwangju, South Korea from 12 to 28 July.

Artistic swimming

Lithuania entered 1 female swimmer. It will mark countries debut in this discipline.

Women

Diving

Lithuania entered 1 female diver.

Women

Swimming 

Lithuania entered 2 female and 6 male swimmers.

Men

Women

Mixed

References

World Aquatics Championships
2019
Nations at the 2019 World Aquatics Championships